The 1970 European Athletics Junior Championships was the inaugural edition of the biennial athletics competition for European athletes aged under twenty. It was held in Colombes, near Paris, France, between 11 and 13 September.

Men's results

Women's results

Medal table

Significant participating athletes

According to the publication Athletics International who published the list below, it is interesting to underline some of the most significant names who competed in Paris Colombes, most of whom did not immediately make their best result but who definitely achieved distinction in the years afterwards:

Pietro Mennea ITA: 5th in 200m (22.3), set world record of 19.72A in 1979 and won 1980 Olympic title.
Fernando Mamede POR: 5th in 800m heat (1:56.3), set world 10,000m record of 27:13.81 in 1984.
Thomas Wessinghage GER: 8th in 1500m (3:57.5), 1982 European 5000m champion.
Bronislaw Malinowski POL: 1st in 2000mSC (5:44.0), 1980 Olympic 3000mSC champion; pb 8:09.11 in 1976.
Jürgen Straub GDR: 6th in 2000mSC heat (5:55.6), 2nd 1980 Olympic 1500m.
Aleksey Spiridonov URS: 2nd in HT (64.88m), set world record of 78.62m in 1976 and 2nd in that year's Olympics.
Karl-Hans Riehm FRG: 4th in HT (64.22m), set world records of 78.50 in 1975 and 80.32 in 1978; 2nd 1984 Olympics.
Aleksandr Makarov URS: 2nd in JT (74.92m), 2nd 1980 Olympics with pb of 89.64 (old model).
Ferenc Paragi HUN: 8th in JT (65.14), set world record of 96.72 (old model) in 1980.
Aleksandr Grebenyuk URS: 7th in Dec (6404 points), European champion in 1978; pb of 8400 in 1977.
Monika Zehrt GDR: 1st in 400m (54.0), Won 1972 Olympic title and set world record of 51.0 that year.
Grazyna Rabsztyn POL: 1st in 100mH (13.9), set world records of 12.48 in 1978 and 12.36 in 1980.
Sara Simeoni ITA: 5th in HJ (1.70m), 1980 Olympic champion and set world record of 2.01m twice in 1978.
Jacqueline Todten GDR: 1st in JT (55.20m), 2nd 1972 Olympics; pb of 63.14m (old model) in 1973.
Eva Wilms FRG: 5th in Pen (4315 points), 4641 indoors in 1977; 2nd European Indoor SP in 1980; pb of 21.43 in 1977.

References

Results
European Junior Championships 1970. World Junior Athletics History. Retrieved on 2013-05-29.

European Athletics U20 Championships
International athletics competitions hosted by France
European Junior
Sport in Hauts-de-Seine
1970 in French sport
1970 in youth sport